Cefntilla Halt was a request stop on the former Coleford, Monmouth, Usk and Pontypool Railway. It was opened on 27 March 1954 and was open for less than two years, closing in 1955 when the railway closed. It was not near any particular village but was located near Cefntilla Court, the family seat of the Somerset family, the current holders of the title Baron Raglan and relatives of the House of Beaufort. It was construction was first suggested by FitzRoy Somerset, 4th Baron Raglan to the BR in 1953 to bring needed passenger traffic to the line, which was under threat of closure. It was located  about 9 miles and 66 chains from Monmouth Troy. The halt consisted of only a single wooden platform with a length of only , a platform lamp and a name-board.

References

Disused railway stations in Monmouthshire
Railway stations in Great Britain opened in 1954
Railway stations in Great Britain closed in 1955
Railway stations opened by British Rail